Jesús Alejandro Ortiz Parra (born 3 September 1987) is a Venezuelan football manager, currently in charge of Portuguesa.

Career
Born in Rubio, Táchira, Ortiz began his career with local schools before joining Deportivo Táchira's youth categories. In September 2015, he left the club to join a host of compatriots at Lebanese side Salam Zgharta FC.

Ortiz returned to his home country and Táchira in 2016, later working at Mineros de Guayana before returning to the club again in 2019. On 14 March 2022, he was named manager of Deportivo Lara's youth categories.

On 28 July 2022, Ortiz was named interim manager of Lara, after Eduardo Saragó resigned. On 9 August, he was permanently appointed manager.

On 1 March 2023, as Lara was denied a license to play in the 2022 top tier season, Ortiz replaced Martín Brignani at the helm of Portuguesa.

References

External links

1987 births
Living people
People from Rubio, Venezuela
Venezuelan football managers
Venezuelan Primera División managers
Asociación Civil Deportivo Lara managers
Portuguesa F.C. managers
Expatriate sportspeople in Lebanon